Masterpiece "Commemorative Edition" is a re-edition of the debut album Masterpiece by reggaeton duo R.K.M & Ken-Y. It was released on April 3, 2007. The Commemorative Edition reached #4 on the Top Latin Albums chart.

Track listing

Disc 1 - CD

 Oh Oh, ¿Porqué Te Están Velando?
 Dame Lo Que Quiero (New Version)
 Llorarás
 Te Vas (Remix)
 Me Matas (Remix) (feat. Daddy Yankee)
 Yo Te Motivé Mejor Que El
 Cruz Y Maldición (feat. Nicky Jam)
 Dime (feat. Pitbull)
 Down (Remix) (feat. Hector El Father)
 Igual Que Ayer (New Version)
 Hoy Te Vi
 Amigo (New Version)
 Hey Chula (feat. Carlitos Way)
 Sueltate (Baby Funk Waxsound Mix)
 Down (Pop Version)

Disc 2 - DVD
 Me Estoy Muriendo
 Behind The Scenes (Part 1)
 MasterPiece World Tour (EPK)
 Behind Masterpiece World Tour
 Pasado (feat. Nicky Jam)
 Fuera De Serie (Rep. Dom.) (Live)
 Lucha Libre
 Dame Lo Que Quiero (Video Live)
 Justas 2006 (P.R.) Part 1
 Down (Original Version)
 Justas 2006 (P.R.) Part 2
 Me Matas
 Justas 2006 (P.R.) Part 3
 Dime
 Justas 2006 (P.R.) Last Part
 Down (Remix) (Premios Juventud 2006)
 Making Of Llorarás
 Behind The Scenes (Down Video)
 Down (Remix) (Hector El Father)
 Making Of Siguelo Bailando
 Behind The Scenes (Orlando Magics)
 Igual Que Ayer

Charts

See also
List of Billboard Latin Rhythm Albums number ones of 2007

References

2007 compilation albums
2007 video albums
R.K.M & Ken-Y albums